Antonio Guzmán Cornejo (died 1642) was a Roman Catholic prelate who served as Bishop of Tui (1640–1642).

Biography
On 17 July 1640, Antonio Guzmán Cornejo was selected by the King of Spain as Bishop of Tui and confirmed by Pope Urban VIII on 8 October 1640. In December 1640, he was consecrated bishop by Agustín Spínola Basadone, Archbishop of Santiago de Compostela, with Miguel Avellán, Titular Bishop of Siriensis, and Fernando Montero Espinosa, Bishop of Nueva Segovia, serving as co-consecrators. He served as Bishop of Tui until his death on 29 August 1642.

References

External links and additional sources
 (for Chronology of Bishops) 
 (for Chronology of Bishops) 

17th-century Roman Catholic bishops in Spain
Bishops appointed by Pope Urban VIII
1642 deaths